Good Luck with Whatever is the seventh studio album by Dawes, released on October 2, 2020 via Rounder Records.

Track listing
All songs written by Taylor Goldsmith, except where noted.

Charts

References

2020 albums
Dawes (band) albums